Roots and Wings may refer to:

Roots and Wings (James Bonamy album)
Roots and Wings (Neal Casal album)
Roots and Wings (Terri Clark album)
Roots and Wings (Jill Johnson album)
Roots and Wings (Vaya Con Dios album)